MHMC may refer to:

 Mayanei Hayeshua Medical Center, a Haredi hospital in Bnei Brak, Israel
 Montclair Hospital Medical Center, a hospital in Montclair, California